Rhizomolgula is a genus of ascidian tunicates in the family Molgulidae.

Species within the genus Rhizomolgula include:
 Rhizomolgula globularis (Pallas, 1776) 
 Rhizomolgula japonica Oka, 1926

Species names currently considered to be synonyms:
 Rhizomolgula arenaria Ritter, 1901: synonym of Rhizomolgula globularis (Pallas, 1776) 
 Rhizomolgula gigantea Redikorzev, 1907: synonym of Rhizomolgula globularis (Pallas, 1776) 
 Rhizomolgula intermedia Michaelsen, 1908: synonym of Rhizomolgula globularis (Pallas, 1776) 
 Rhizomolgula ritteri Hartmeyer, 1903: synonym of Rhizomolgula globularis (Pallas, 1776) 
 Rhizomolgula warpachovskii Redikorzev, 1908: synonym of Rhizomolgula globularis (Pallas, 1776)

References

Stolidobranchia
Tunicate genera